Liang Zicheng (born 18 March 1982) is a former Chinese-born Hong Kong professional footballer who played as a striker.

Career statistics

Club
As of 20 September 2008

External links
 Liang Zicheng at HKFA

1982 births
Living people
Footballers from Guangzhou
Chinese footballers
Hong Kong footballers
Guangzhou F.C. players
Hong Kong First Division League players
Hong Kong Premier League players
South China AA players
Hong Kong Rangers FC players
Fourway Athletics players
Kitchee SC players
Sun Hei SC players
Eastern Sports Club footballers
R&F (Hong Kong) players
Expatriate footballers in Hong Kong
Chinese expatriate footballers
Chinese expatriate sportspeople in Hong Kong
Association football forwards
Association football midfielders